Rochelle Maria Low (born May 19, 1969 in Vancouver, British Columbia) is a former field hockey player from Canada, who represented her native country at the 1992 Summer Olympics in Barcelona, Spain. There she ended up in seventh place with the Canadian National Women's Team. She was affiliated with the University of Victoria.

References

External links
 
 Canadian Olympic Committee 
 

1969 births
Living people
Canadian female field hockey players
Olympic field hockey players of Canada
Field hockey players at the 1992 Summer Olympics
Pan American Games medalists in field hockey
Pan American Games silver medalists for Canada
Field hockey players at the 1991 Pan American Games
Field hockey players from Vancouver
Victoria Vikes athletes
Medalists at the 1991 Pan American Games